Ixora calycina is a species of flowering plant in the family Rubiaceae. It is endemic to Sri Lanka.

References

External links
World Checklist of Rubiaceae

calycina
Endemic flora of Sri Lanka
Endangered plants
Taxonomy articles created by Polbot